The Western Warriors were a minor league baseball team playing in the independent Western Baseball League, and not affiliated with any Major League Baseball team.

The team began when the Grays Harbor Gulls ceased operations midway through the 1998 season.  The league assumed control of the team, renaming them the Western Warriors.  The Warriors went on a 68-game road trip, not having a home stadium to play in.

Western Baseball League teams
Defunct baseball teams in California
Baseball teams disestablished in 1998
Baseball teams established in 1998